Nicklas Røjkjær (born 24 July 1998) is a Danish footballer who plays for FC Fredericia.

References

Living people
1998 births
Association football midfielders
Danish men's footballers
Silkeborg IF players
F.C. Copenhagen players
Viborg FF players
Esbjerg fB players
FC Fredericia players
Danish Superliga players
Danish 1st Division players
People from Silkeborg
Sportspeople from the Central Denmark Region